The Maduwongga (Martu Wangka) are an Aboriginal Australian people of the Goldfields-Esperance region of Western Australia.

Language
The language spoken by the Maduwongga was called Kabal.

Country
Ecologically they lived in country marked by mallee Eucalypt species.

History
According to oral traditions picked up by ethnographers, the Maduwongga may have moved in from an original homeland further east, and displaced the Kalamaia, westwards beyond Bullabulling.

Alternative names
 Jindi, Yindi
 Maduwonga
 Kabul
 Julbaritja (Ngurlu exonym for them meaning 'southerners')

Notes

Citations

Sources

Aboriginal peoples of Western Australia
Goldfields-Esperance